Metro Ursynów is a station on Line M1 of the Warsaw Metro, located in the Ursynów district in south Warsaw, at the junction of Aleja KEN and Surowieckiego Street.

The station was opened on 7 April 1995 as part of the inaugural stretch of the Warsaw Metro, between Kabaty and Politechnika.

References

External links

Railway stations in Poland opened in 1995
Ursynów
Line 1 (Warsaw Metro) stations